The Afterschool Caucuses are bipartisan caucuses in the United States Congress established to build support for afterschool programs and increase resources for afterschool care. Senators Lisa Murkowski (R-AK) and Tina Smith (D-MN) chair the Senate caucus, while Representative David Cicilline (D-RI) chairs the House caucus.

History 

The House and Senate Afterschool Caucuses were founded on March 3, 2005. In addition to the co-chairs, the founding members of Senate and House Afterschool Caucuses were Senators Barbara Boxer (D-CA) and Susan Collins (R-ME) and Representative Dale Kildee (D-MI). Today, these Caucuses serve as a voice on the issue of strengthening and increasing the availability of afterschool programs.

Purpose 

The Caucuses were formed in response to the finding that 14.3 million children go home alone after the school day ends, including more than 40,000 kindergartners and almost four million middle school students in grades six to eight.   The Caucuses act to promote the availability of afterschool programs, with a special emphasis on the 21st Century Community Learning Center (CCLC) program, for every American school-age child by increasing public awareness of such programs and supporting increased federal resources.  In each chamber, the Caucuses have conducted a variety of activities supporting the goal of quality, affordable programs for all children.  This has included organizing congressional briefings on specific topics such as the role of the STEM fields in afterschool (science, technology, engineering and mathematics) education; disseminating letters in support of increased resources for afterschool to the President as well as congressional colleagues; sharing new research on effective programs; and organizing press events around the Afterschool Challenge with celebrity supporters.

The Afterschool Caucuses seek to educate the public on the role that afterschool programs play in the lives of families, and promote the expansion of federal, state, and local support in order to make access to these programs a reality for all interested children and families.

Membership 

The Afterschool Caucuses are bipartisan. As of March 2021 there were a total of 40 members in the House Afterschool Caucus with 37 Democrats and 3 Republicans and 25 members of the Senate Afterschool Caucus with 6 Republicans and 19 Democrats.

United States House of Representatives

Democrats 

 Terri Sewell of Alabama
 Doris Matsui of California
 Barbara Lee of California
 Zoe Lofgren of California
 Adam Schiff of California
 Joe Courtney of Connecticut
 Rosa DeLauro of Connecticut
 John B. Larson of Connecticut
 Kathy Castor of Florida
 Debbie Wasserman Schultz of Florida
 Jan Schakowsky of Illinois
 Bobby Rush of Illinois
 Danny K. Davis of Illinois
 André Carson of Indiana
 Richard Neal of Massachusetts
 Stephen F. Lynch of Massachusetts
 Jim McGovern of Massachusetts
 Chellie Pingree of Maine
 Dan Kildee of Michigan
 Betty McCollum of Minnesota
 Bennie Thompson of Mississippi
 David Price of North Carolina
 Brian Higgins of New York
 Carolyn Maloney of New York
 Gregory Meeks of New York
 Tim Ryan of Ohio
 David Cicilline of Rhode Island (co-chair)
 James Langevin of Rhode Island
 Jim Cooper of Tennessee
 Al Green of Texas
 Sheila Jackson Lee of Texas
 Lloyd Doggett of Texas
 Henry Cuellar of Texas
 Rick Larsen of Washington
 Adam Smith of Washington

Republicans 

 Mike Simpson of Idaho
 Joe Wilson of South Carolina

United States Senate

Democrats 

 Dianne Feinstein of California
 Chris Coons of Delaware
 Dick Durbin of Illinois
 Angus King of Maine
 Chris Van Hollen of Maryland
 Debbie Stabenow of Michigan
 Amy Klobuchar of Minnesota
 Tina Smith of Minnesota (co-chair)
 Jeanne Shaheen of New Hampshire
 Bob Menendez of New Jersey
 Kirsten Gillibrand of New York
 Chuck Schumer of New York
 Bob Casey of Pennsylvania
 Sheldon Whitehouse of Rhode Island
 Jack Reed of Rhode Island
 Bernie Sanders of Vermont
 Patty Murray of Washington
 Maria Cantwell of Washington
 Tammy Baldwin of Wisconsin

Republicans 

 Lisa Murkowski of Alaska (co-chair)
 John Boozman of Arkansas
 Jerry Moran of Kansas
 Susan Collins of Maine
 John Thune of South Dakota
 Shelley Moore Capito of West Virginia

References

Caucuses of the United States Congress